MFK Žarnovica is a Slovak association football club located in Žarnovica. It currently plays in 3. liga (3rd tier in Slovak football system).

Colors and badge 
Its colors are black-white and red-yellow.

External links
Futbalnet profile 
Club profile

References

Football clubs in Slovakia